Arthur Feltham was a professional rugby league footballer who played in the 1920s and 1930s. He played at club level for Castleford, during his time at Castleford he scored three 2-point drop goals.

References

External links
Search for "Feltham" at rugbyleagueproject.org

Castleford Tigers players
English rugby league players
Place of birth missing
Place of death missing
Year of birth missing
Year of death missing